is a Japanese manga series written and illustrated by Masanori Morita. It was first serialized in Shueisha's shōnen manga magazine Weekly Shōnen Jump from October 2005 to June 2006, and later transferred to the publisher's seinen manga magazine Weekly Young Jump, where it ran from January 2007 to September 2019. Its chapters were collected in 20 tankōbon volumes. It was adapted into an eight-episode television drama series broadcast on TV Asahi from July to September 2019.

Media

Manga
Written and illustrated by Masanori Morita, Beshari-Gurashi was first serialized for 28 chapters in Shueisha's shōnen manga magazine Weekly Shōnen Jump from October 3, 2005, to June 26, 2006. Following a 29th chapter published in Akamaru Jump on August 16, 2006, the series was transferred to Shueisha's seinen manga magazine Weekly Young Jump on January 18, 2007, and finished on June 11, 2015; a mini-story was serialized in the same magazine from July 4 to September 12, 2019. Shueisha collected its chapters in twenty tankōbon volumes; the first three volumes were released under the Jump Comics imprint from February 3 to October 4, 2006, and the volumes were later re-released and continued under the Young Jump Comics imprint from May 18, 2007, to September 19, 2019.

Drama
An eight-episode television drama adaptation was broadcast on TV Asahi from July 27 to September 14, 2019.

Reception
Beshari-Gurashi was nominated for the 18th Tezuka Osamu Cultural Prize, for both the Grand Prize and Readers' Award, in 2014.

Notes

References

External links
  
  
 

Comedy anime and manga
Coming-of-age anime and manga
Seinen manga
Shōnen manga
Shueisha manga
TV Asahi television dramas